The International Association for Vegetation Science (IAVS) promotes contact between scientists and others interested in the study of vegetation ecology, promotes research and publication of research results. In 1939 the International Phytosociological Society (IPS) was founded, with its headquarters in Montpellier, France. After the Second World War it was reconstituted as the Internationale Vereinigung für Vegetationskunde (IVV), which adopted a constitution at the International Botanical Congress of 1954. The current name was adopted in 1981–82.

Publications
The society publishes:
 IAVS Bulletin
 Journal of Vegetation Science
 Applied Vegetation Science
 Resolutions

Awards
The Alexander von Humboldt Medal is a prize awarded biennially from 2011 onwards by the association. The award is intended to honor scientists who have contributed greatly to the intellectual development and advancement of vegetation science and plant community ecology. Honorary membership is also bestowed by the society.

Medal recipients
2011 J. Philip Grime
2013 David Tilman
2015 Sandra Lavorel
2017 F. Stuart Chapin III
2019 Pierre Legendre

References

Further reading
 published by IAVS

External links
 

Botanical societies
International scientific organizations